Ellen Clark's crayfish (Euastacus clarkae) was named by Morgan "in respect of Ellen Clark’s pioneering parastacid studies". It is restricted to headwater reaches of highland streams draining the plateau and feeding the Hastings and Forbes rivers, at elevations ranging from  asl. This species is fully protected by the Australian government regulations, hence no trade or commercial utilization of the species is allowed. Horwitz and Richardson classified crayfish burrows based on their relationship to the water table, into three categories:

 Type 1: Burrows in or connected to permanent waters
 Type 2: Burrows connected to the water table
 Type 3: Burrows independent of the water table

E. clarkae constructs a burrows system according to the location and maturity of the burrow builder, however, all burrows would be within the “Type 1” category with all burrows in, or connected to open water.

References

Freshwater crustaceans of Australia
Euastacus
Crustaceans described in 1997